Nagykamarás (Romanian: Camarasu Mare) is a village in Békés County, in the Southern Great Plain region of south-east Hungary. In 2015, the village had a population of 1,383.

References

Populated places in Békés County